Scopelocheiridae is a family of crustaceans belonging to the order Amphipoda. The family was first described in 1997 by Helen E. Stoddart and James K. Lowry. The type genus is Scopelocheirus Bate, 1857.

Genera:
 Anisocallisoma Hendrycks & Conlan, 2003
 Aroui Chevreux, 1911
 Austrocallisoma Kilgallen & Lowry, 2015
 Bathycallisoma Dahl, 1959
 Eucallisoma J.L.Barnard, 1961
 Haptocallisoma Horton & Thurston, 2015
 Paracallisoma Chevreux, 1903
 Paracallisomopsis Gurjanova, 1962
 Pseudocallisoma Horton & Thurston, 2015
 Scopelocheiropsis Schellenberg, 1926
 Scopelocheirus Spence Bate, 1857
 Tayabasa Kilgallen & Lowry, 2015

References

Amphipoda
Crustaceans described in 1997
Taxa named by James K. Lowry